, is one of the 10 biggest construction companies in Japan. It was launched in 2013 by the merger of the Hazama Corporation and Ando Corporation. It has overseas offices in Asia, especially in the South Asian countries like Nepal, as well as in the United States, Mexico, Central and South America.

History
The predecessors of the current company, Hazama and Ando, were established in 1889 and 1873 respectively. The two companies originally formed a capital and business tie-up in 2003, and were collaborating over order receipts and materials procurement before the merger.

Selected Projects
Tokyo's Ginza Subway Line (1933)
Kanmon Bridge (1971)
Monseñor Óscar Arnulfo Romero International Airport - San Salvador (1980)
One Raffles Place - Singapore (1986)
Autopolis - Hita, Japan (1989)
Kansai International Airport (1989)
Tokyo Big Sight (1995)
New Choluteca Bridge - Choluteca, Honduras (1998)
 underground section (Masjid Jamek-Ampang Park), 1998
Petronas Twin Towers (Tower 1) - Kuala Lumpur (1998)

Chubu Centrair International Airport (airport island reclamation) (2003)
Hải Vân Tunnel (2005)
Subic–Clark–Tarlac Expressway - Manila (2008)
Algeria East–West Highway (eastern section) (2011)

See also

Les Noces de Pierrette
Albert Ando

References

External links
 Official global site 
 English part of official global site 

Construction and civil engineering companies of Japan
Construction and civil engineering companies based in Tokyo
Japanese companies established in 2013
Companies listed on the Tokyo Stock Exchange
Japanese brands
Construction and civil engineering companies established in 2013